In anthropology, reflectometry devices are often used to gauge human skin color through the measurement of skin reflectance. These devices are typically pointed at the upper arm or forehead, with the emitted waves then interpreted at various percentages. Lower frequencies represent lower skin reflectance and thus darker pigmentation, whereas higher frequencies represent greater skin reflectance and therefore lighter pigmentation.

Below are global estimates of skin reflectance frequencies in various countries, populations and areas as observed and predicted by Jablonski and Chaplin.

References

Skin pigmentation